Chrome may refer to:

Materials
 Chrome plating, a process of surfacing with chromium
 Chrome alum, a chemical used in mordanting and photographic film

Computing
 Google Chrome, a web browser developed by Google
 ChromeOS, a Google Chrome- and Linux-based operating system
 User interface chrome, the borders and widgets that frame the content part of a window
 Chrome (Mozilla) or XUL, the Mozilla XML user interface language
 Chrome (programming language) or Oxygene, an Object Pascal implementation for the .NET Framework
 Microsoft Chrome, an API for DirectX
 S3 Chrome, a series of graphics accelerators

Gaming
 Chrome Engine, a game engine developed by Techland
 Chrome (video game), a 2003 sci-fi first-person shooter by Techland

Literature
 Chrome (comics) or Allen Marc Yuricic, a Marvel Comics male mutant character
 Jenny Swensen or Chrome, a Marvel Comics female paranormal character
 Chrome, a character in "Burning Chrome" by William Gibson
 Chrome, a gay-themed science fiction novel by George Nader
 Chrome (Dr. Stone), a character in the manga series Dr. Stone

Music
 Chrome (band), an American rock band, from San Francisco in the 1970s
 Chrome (singer), British singer

Albums
 Chrome (Catherine Wheel album) (1993)
 Chrome (The Screaming Jets album) (2016)
 Chrome (Trace Adkins album) (2001)

Songs
 "Chrome" (Debbie Harry song) (1981)
 "Chrome" (Trace Adkins song) (2002)
 "Chrome", a song by Katatonia from Last Fair Deal Gone Down
 "Chrome", a song by VNV Nation from Matter + Form

Places
 Chrome, California, an unincorporated community
 Chrome, New Jersey, an unincorporated community

Other uses
 Chrome (XM), a former music satellite channel
 Chrome Industries, a manufacturer of cycling bags, apparel, and footwear

See also
 Chrome Dokuro, a female character in Reborn!
 Chromeffects, a 3D graphics and video add-on for Windows 98
 Chromite, a mineral ore from which chromium is produced
 Chromium, a chemical element
 Chromium (disambiguation)
 Chromium (web browser), the open source counterpart to Google Chrome
 ChromiumOS, the open source counterpart to Google ChromeOS
 Google Chrome Frame, an Internet Explorer plug-in based on Chromium
 Ferrochrome, an alloy of chrome and iron, most commonly used in stainless steel production